Roger Federer defeated Stan Wawrinka in the final, 6–4, 7–5 to win the men's singles tennis title at the 2017 Indian Wells Masters. It was his record-equaling fifth Indian Wells title, 25th ATP Tour Masters 1000 singles title, and 90th singles title overall. He did not lose a single set in the entire tournament.

Novak Djokovic was the three-time defending champion, but lost in the fourth round to Nick Kyrgios.

Seeds
All seeds receive a bye into the second round.

Draw

Finals

Top half

Section 1

Section 2

Section 3

Section 4

Bottom half

Section 5

Section 6

Section 7

Section 8

Qualifying

Seeds

Qualifiers

Lucky losers

Qualifying draw

First qualifier

Second qualifier

Third qualifier

Fourth qualifier

Fifth qualifier

Sixth qualifier

Seventh qualifier

Eighth qualifier

Ninth qualifier

Tenth qualifier

Eleventh qualifier

Twelfth qualifier

References
Main Draw
Qualifying Draw

Men's Singles